Rigault de Genouilly may refer to:

Charles Rigault de Genouilly (1807–1873), French admiral
, a French Navy aviso commissioned in 1932 and sunk in 1940